is a Japanese professional golfer who has played his whole career on the Japan Golf Tour.

Idoki, while playing on the Japan Golf Tour, had two victories: the 1990 Kansai Pro Championship and the 1993 NST Niigata Open.

In his first time playing professionally in the United States, he won the 2013 Senior PGA Championship.

Professional wins (7)

Japan Golf Tour wins (2)

Champions Tour wins (1)

Japan PGA Senior Tour wins (4)
2012 Fuji Film Senior Championship
2021 ISPS Handa Tanoshiku Omoshiroi Senior Tournament, Komatsu Open, Trust Group Cup Sasebo Senior Open Golf Tournament

Results in major championships

CUT = missed the halfway cut
Note: Idoki only played in the PGA Championship.

Senior major championships

Wins (1)

Senior results timeline
Results are not in chronological order prior to 2017.

CUT = missed the halfway cut
"T" indicates a tie for a place.

External links

Japanese male golfers
Japan Golf Tour golfers
PGA Tour Champions golfers
Winners of senior major golf championships
Sportspeople from Osaka Prefecture
People from Ibaraki, Osaka
1961 births
Living people